Júlio César Campozano and Alejandro González won the first edition of the tournament, defeating Daniel Kosakowski and Peter Polansky 6–4, 7–5 in the final.

Seeds

  Víctor Estrella /  Daniel Garza (quarterfinals)
  Vahid Mirzadeh /  Maciek Sykut (semifinals)
  Fabiano de Paula /  Rogério Dutra da Silva (quarterfinals)
  Luis Díaz-Barriga /  Alejandro Fabbri (first round)

Draw

Draw

References
 Main Draw

Visit Panama Cup - Doubles
2012 Doubles